Sherry L. Middaugh (née Hamel, born October 11, 1966 in Rosetown, Saskatchewan) is a Canadian curler from Victoria Harbour, Ontario. Before marrying world champion curler Wayne Middaugh, she was known as Sherry Scheirich. She is a five-time Ontario champion and a one-time Saskatchewan curling champion. She is currently the coach of Team Tracy Fleury.

Career
Middaugh, originally from Saskatchewan, won the 1986 Saskatchewan Junior Women's Championship. She represented Saskatchewan at the 1986 Canadian Junior Women's Curling Championship, where she tied for fourth with a 6–4 record. 

Her lone Saskatchewan Hearts victory came in 1996, when she defeated Sandra Peterson (Schmirler) in the provincial final, 8–5. She represented Saskatchewan at her first Scott Tournament of Hearts in 1996, and finished with a 7–5 record. In her new province of Ontario at the 1999 Scott Tournament of Hearts, she played third for Kim Gellard, but finished 4–7. She played at the 2001 Scott Tournament of Hearts. Middaugh led her team to the semifinals where she lost to Kelley Law of British Columbia. At the 2002 Scott Tournament of Hearts, Middaugh was ousted once again in the semifinals, this time to defending champion Colleen Jones. Middaugh failed to make the Scotts in 2003, but instead won the Canada Cup of Curling beating Kelley Law in the final. Middaugh qualified for the 2004 Scott Tournament of Hearts, but she lost in the semi-final to Quebec's Marie-France Larouche. In 2007, Middaugh won her first Grand Slam event by winning the 2007 Sobeys Slam. At the 2008 Scotties Tournament of Hearts, Middaugh lost in the semifinal to Manitoba's Jennifer Jones, her fourth semifinal loss.  Middaugh also participated as a third for Laurel Kostuk at the 1986 Canadian Junior Championships and she won the 2003 JCV Skins Game. At the 2008 Scotties Tournament of Hearts Middaugh also won the Shot of the Week Award and a Bronze medal via a 9–8 loss to Manitoba's Jennifer Jones, in an extra end semifinal. Jones would go on to win the 2009 Scotties Tournament of Hearts in Victoria, B.C. as Team Canada.

Middaugh attended the 2011 Scotties Tournament of Hearts as the alternate for the Rachel Homan team. In 2012, she won her second Grand Slam event of her career by winning the 2012 Curlers Corner Autumn Gold Curling Classic, defeating Homan in the final.

At the 2013 Canadian Olympic Curling Trials, the team started slowly with a 1–3 record. However, the team won three straight games to finish the round-robin tied for second at 4–3 with the Chelsea Carey and Rachel Homan rinks. Homan claimed second based on the draw shot challenge while Middaugh and Carey played a tiebreaker. The Middaugh rink found success defeating Carey in the tiebreaker and defeating Homan in the semifinals. Middaugh's rink was unable to defeat the Jennifer Jones rink in the final, therefore claiming the silver medal at the event.

In 2019, Middaugh made her Canadian Senior Curling Championships debut at the 2019 Canadian Senior Curling Championships and placed second, losing in an extra end to Sherry Anderson. She started coaching the Tracy Fleury rink for the 2020–21 season.

Personal life
Middaugh owns her own company 4M Home & Garden. She is married to Wayne Middaugh and has two children, Kelly and Emily.

Grand Slam record

Former events

References

CCA Stats

External links

Curlers from Saskatchewan
Curlers from Simcoe County
Living people
1966 births
Canadian women curlers
Continental Cup of Curling participants
People from Rosetown
Canada Cup (curling) participants
Canadian curling coaches